Felsko may refer to:

Johann Felsko, (1813—1902), an architect, urban planner and the chief architect of Riga for 35 years 
Karl Felsko, (1844—1918), one of the most productive architects during the building boom in Riga of the late 19th century and early 20th century